The people's science movement (PSM) aims to popularise science and scientific outlook among common people. Kerala Sasthra Sahithya Parishad, Bharat Gyan Vigyan Samiti, Assam Science Society, Bigyan Prachar Samithy (Orissa), We the Sapiens and the All India Peoples Science Network are some popular people's science movements in India.

People's science movements in India
Kerala Sasthra Sahithya Parishad
Pondicherry Science Forum
Bharat Gyan Vigyan Samiti
Tamil Nadu Science Forum
Jan Vignana Vedika
Delhi Science Forum
Assam Science Society
Tripura Science Forum
Bharat Gyan Vigyan Samiti Uttar Pradesh
Bharat Gyan Vigyan Samiti Haryana
Bharat Gyan Vigyan Samiti Odisha
Bharat Gyan Vigyan Samiti Utharkhand 
We, the Sapiens
All India Peoples Science Network

References

"Secularism and People's Science Movement in India" and "Towards a People's Science Movement" from Economic and Political Weekly
"People's Science Movement" from Science, technology, imperialism, and war
"The People's Science Movements" from Knowing Nature
"Science for social change"

Scientific organisations based in India
Social movements in India
Science in society